Oreamuno is a canton in the Cartago province of Costa Rica. The head city is in San Rafael district.

History 
Oreamuno was created on 17 August 1914 by decree 68.

Geography 
Oreamuno has an area of  km² and a mean elevation of  metres.

The canton extends from its suburban head city of San Rafael northward into the Cordillera Central (Central Mountain Range). Irazú Volcano looms large in the northern reaches of the canton.

Districts 
The canton of Oreamuno is subdivided into the following districts:
 San Rafael
 Cot
 Potrero Cerrado
 Cipreses
 Santa Rosa

Demographics 

For the 2011 census, Oreamuno had a population of  inhabitants.

Transportation

Road transportation 
The canton is covered by the following road routes:

Rail transportation 
The Interurbano Line operated by Incofer goes through this canton.

References 

Cantons of Cartago Province
Populated places in Cartago Province